USS SC-1, prior to July 1920 known as USS Submarine Chaser No. 1 or USS S.C. 1, was an SC-1-class submarine chaser built for the United States Navy during World War I.

SC-1 was a wooden-hulled 110-foot (34 m) submarine chaser built at Naval Station New Orleans in New Orleans, Louisiana. She was commissioned on either 1 or 8 October 1917 as USS Submarine Chaser No. 1, abbreviated at the time as USS S.C. 1.

During World War I, S.C. 1 was based at Base 27, Plymouth, England, from which she conducted antisubmarine patrols against German submarines as a part of Unit 1 with the submarine chasers S.C. 344 and USS S.C. 345.

When the U.S. Navy adopted its modern hull number system on 17 July 1920, Submarine Chaser No. 1 was classified as SC-1 and her name was shortened to USS SC-1.

On 20 July 1921, the Navy sold SC-1 to Henry A. Hitner's Sons Company of Philadelphia, Pennsylvania.

Notes

References 
 
 NavSource Online: Submarine Chaser Photo Archive: SC-1
 The Subchaser Archives: The History of U.S. Submarine Chasers in the Great War Hull number: SC-1
 Woofenden, Todd A. Hunters of the Steel Sharks: The Submarine Chasers of World War I. Bowdoinham, Maine: Signal Light Books, 2006. .

SC-1-class submarine chasers
World War I patrol vessels of the United States
Ships built in New Orleans
1917 ships